Several vessels have borne the name Dart, for the dart or the River Dart:
  was launched at Plymouth in 1787. Dart initially traded with Newfoundland and then the Mediterranean. From 1797 she made four voyages as a slave ship in the triangular trade in enslaved people. She was condemned at Barbados in 1802 as she was returning to London after having delivered slaves to Demerara.
  was launched at Rotherhithe and made two voyages as a packet boat for the British East India Company; she then disappears from readily accessible online records.
  was launched at Dartmouth in 1799. Between 1800 and 1804 she made two complete voyages from Liverpool as a slave ship. She wrecked in 1804 early in the outward bound leg of her third slave voyage.
  was launched at Ostend in 1792, came into British hands in 1801, and became a sealer and whaler in the South Seas fisheries. She was last listed in 1810.
  was launched in South America in 1797, taken in prize in 1806, made one whaling voyage and one voyage as a privateer capturing five slave vessels off Sierra Leone in 1810, before returning to mercantile trade. She was condemned as unseaworthy in 1813. 
  was a merchant ship built at Sunderland, England in 1818. She made three voyages transporting convicts from Mauritius to Australia.
  operated in the early 1900s as part of the Puget Sound Mosquito Fleet.
 The Dart Container Line operated MV Dart America, MV Dart Atlantic, and MV Dart Europe

Naval vessels

See also
Dart (disambiguation)
Dart 15, Dart 16 and Dart 18, sailing catamarans

Citations

Ship names